The 2019 Premier Lacrosse League season was the inaugural season of the Premier Lacrosse League (PLL). The season began on Saturday, June 1 at Gillette Stadium in Foxborough, Massachusetts and culminated with a championship game played on Saturday, September 21 at Talen Energy Stadium, now known as Subaru Park, in the Philadelphia suburb of Chester, Pennsylvania. Whipsnakes Lacrosse Club defeated Redwoods Lacrosse Club to claim the league title.

Tour Map

Schedule 

‡ = joint event with the Women's Professional Lacrosse League

Standings

College draft
The collegiate draft occurred on April 23 and was broadcast on NBCSN at 6:00 PM EDT. It was hosted by sportscaster Paul Burmeister with help from draft analyst Ryan Boyle. A draft lottery was released on the league's YouTube channel on April 8 to determine the top six picks.

Format:
Each club was awarded four picks. 
The draft order was selected at random and reversed each round until the draft was completed. (The first team with the first pick went last in round two, giving the team who went last in round one to go first in round two). A one-minute countdown clock was started for picks.
Eligible players must currently be in their senior season. 
No current picks could be traded for picks in a future draft.
No trading of players already on rosters for draft picks.

Source:

All Star Game

The inaugural 2019 All-Star Game took place on Sunday, July 21 at Banc of California Stadium in Los Angeles, California. It was broadcast on NBCSN. The two teams captains were Matt Rambo (Whipsnakes) and Trevor Baptiste (Atlas) Team Baptiste won with a score of 17–16 over Team Rambo. The MVP award went to goalie Jack Concannon who had 13 saves in the second half comeback win.

Championship

The Whipsnakes outlasted the Redwoods 12–11 in overtime to claim the inaugural PLL Championship. The ninth overtime game of PLL season was the most exciting. 

After a defensive first quarter with a 1–1 tie, the game heated up in the second quarter when the Whipsnakes went on a 5–0 run.

After halftime, the Whipsnakes continued their goal streak with a 4–0 run. However, being down by 7 goals, the Redwoods mounted an amazing comeback when they scored 6 goals (including a 2-point shot), pulling within 2 points if the Whipsnakes (10–8) in the third quarter.

The fourth quarter saw the Redwoods tie it up with 5:49 left to play. Then the Redwoods scored one more to pull ahead. But local product and league MVP Matt Rambo tied it with just 21.2 seconds remaining. The Whipsnakes won it in overtime and Rambo who scored the winning goal earned the Championship MVP.

League leaders

Source:

Awards

References

See also

Premier Lacrosse League
Premier Lacrosse League
Lacrosse
2019 in Canadian sports